Jarret Doege is an American football quarterback for the Troy Trojans. He has previously played at Bowling Green from 2017 to 2018 and West Virginia from 2019 to 2021 before
transferring to Western Kentucky. After a short stint at there, he is now at Troy University.

High school career
Doege played at LubbockCooper High School in Lubbock, Texas. Although he passed for 3,363 yards and 33 touchdowns during his senior season, he was not heavily recruited. Rated as the No. 55 prostyle quarterback in the country by 247Sports.com, he committed to Bowling Green on March 28, 2016.

College career

Bowling Green

As a freshman at Bowling Green, Doege battled with James Morgan throughout the season for the starting quarterback position, eventually winning the job by the end of the season. In seven games, he passed for 1,381 yards, 12 touchdowns, and 3 interceptions.

Doege was named the starting quarterback at Bowling Green for his sophomore season after Morgan's transfer to FIU. In his first season as the starter, he passed for 2,660 yards, 27 touchdowns, and 15 interceptions. The team, however, struggled as they went 3–9 and fired head coach Mike Jinks after the season.

West Virginia

On May 8, 2019, Doege announced that he was entering the transfer portal and leaving Bowling Green. Eight days later, he committed to West Virginia under head coach Neal Brown, who had coached his brother Seth as an offensive coordinator at Texas Tech. He was redshirted, but he was able to play in four games under the NCAA's new transfer rules. Playing behind starter Austin Kendall, he passed for 818 yards, 7 touchdowns, and 3 interceptions.

Doege beat out Kendall to start for West Virginia before the 2020 season. During the 2020 season, he threw for 2,587 yards, 14 touchdowns, and 4 interceptions while West Virginia finished with a 6–4 record.

On December 31, 2021, Doege announced he would enter the transfer portal.

Western Kentucky
On January 16, 2022, Doege announced he would transfer to Western Kentucky.

Troy

After transferring to Western Kentucky, he lost the quarterback competition during Western Kentucky's fall camp. As a result, Doege entered the transfer portal and enrolled at Troy University. During the season, Troy beat Western Kentucky 34-27 on October 1. Doege came in the game for injured starter Gunnar Watson and completed 7 of 8 passes for 71 yards and 2 touchdowns. Doege referenced a similar quote by Seattle Seahawks quarterback Geno Smith when he said, "They wrote me off, I didn’t write back though." via Instagram after the game.

Personal life
Doege's older brother, Seth, is a college football analyst at Ole Miss and was a player at Texas Tech.

References

External links
Bowling Green Falcons bio
West Virginia Mountaineers bio

Living people
Players of American football from Texas
American football quarterbacks
Bowling Green Falcons football players
West Virginia Mountaineers football players
Western Kentucky Hilltoppers football players
Year of birth missing (living people)
Troy Trojans football players